The 2010 Woking Council election took place on 6 May 2010, on the same day as the 2010 general election, to elect members of Woking Borough Council in Surrey, England. One third of the council was up for election and the council stayed under no overall control.

After the election, the composition of the council was:
Conservative 18
Liberal Democrat 17
Independent 1

Background
After the last election in 2008 the Conservatives held a majority on the council with 19 seats, compared to 17 for the Liberal Democrats. However, in July 2009 the Conservatives lost their majority after councillor Peter Ankers resigned from the Conservatives to sit as an independent.

13 of the 36 seats on the council were contested in the election with the leader of the council, Conservative John Kingsbury, among the councillors who were defending seats. Byfleet ward saw 2 seats being contested after Conservative councillor Simon Hutton resigned from the council earlier in the year.

Election result
The results saw no party win a majority, with the Conservatives the largest party on 18 seats, the Liberal Democrats on 17 and 1 Independent. The Conservatives gained 1 seat in Mount Hermon East after Carl Thomson defeated Liberal Democrat councillor Norman Johns. However, the Liberal Democrats took another seat back after winning one of the two seats contested in Byfleet ward. Among the Conservatives to hold their seats was Mohammed Iqbal in Maybury and Sheerwater ward, who was therefore able to become the first Asian mayor of Woking. Overall turnout in the election was 69.73%.

The election also saw Jonathan Lord win the Woking parliamentary constituency with 26,551 votes, beating Liberal Democrat Rosie Sharpley into second place. The seat had previously been held by Humfrey Malins, who announced his intention to stand down in 2009.

Ward results

References

2010
2010 English local elections
May 2010 events in the United Kingdom
2010s in Surrey